Danielle Anderson (born January 24, 1986), known by her stage name Danielle Ate the Sandwich, is a singer-songwriter from Fort Collins, Colorado.

Anderson has released seven independent albums starting with her self-titled album, Danielle Ate the Sandwich, released in 2007, followed by Things People Do (2009), Two Bedroom Apartment (2010), Like a King (2012), The Drawing Back of Curtains, music from the documentary film Packed in a Trunk: The Lost Art of Edith Lake Wilkinson (2015), The Terrible Dinner Guest (2016), and Live from San Francisco (2019).

Early life 
Anderson was born in Grant, Nebraska and spent her childhood in Fremont, Nebraska, moving to Littleton, Colorado to graduate from Arapahoe High School in 2004. Born into a musical family, Anderson learned to play the piano, the clarinet, and the saxophone in elementary school and the violin in high school. Anderson also sang in the choir and would write her own songs, but she didn't start singing them publicly until college.

After high school, Anderson studied apparel and design at Colorado State University in Fort Collins, Colorado. She graduated in 2008 and continued to live in Fort Collins until 2018.

After receiving her degree, Anderson worked as a seamstress at an alteration shop and sold handmade handbags and clothes. At that time she considered music a hobby, playing music with a group of friends under the name Backdraft: the Musical. After the group parted ways, Anderson decided to go solo, creating her stage name Danielle Ate the Sandwich, posting videos of her original songs on Youtube and booking shows and tours around the country.

Career 
While attending college at Colorado State University in Fort Collins, Colorado, Anderson played open mic nights for over a year and began to record her first CD, which she self-recorded and produced, her self-titled Danielle Ate the Sandwich.

In 2007, Anderson began posting videos of her own songs as well as cover songs on YouTube. She played a majority of her songs with a ukulele and provided funny skits before many of her videos. Her video, "Conversations with Dead People", a song from her first album, was featured on YouTube's homepage. Danielle Ate the Sandwich gained thousands of views in a few short days and hundreds of new subscribers.

In 2009, Anderson became a full-time singer songwriter and began touring nationally.

Danielle Ate the Sandwich's 2010 album Two Bedroom Apartment reached #5 on the iTunes top selling singer/songwriter charts.

Danielle Ate the Sandwich opened for Mumford and Sons on an episode of ETown in October 2010.

In 2015, Danielle composed the soundtrack to the Emmy-nominated, HBO documentary, "Packed in a Trunk: The Lost Art of Edith Lake Wilkinson."

She is best known as a Colorado singer/songwriter and is currently based in Kansas City, Missouri.

Anderson's primary instruments are a tenor and a baritone ukulele, both made by Mya-Moe Ukuleles.

Discography

Albums
 Danielle Ate the Sandwich (2007)
 Things People Do(2009)
 Two Bedroom Apartment(2010)
 Like a King (2012)
 The Drawing Back of Curtains (2015)
 The Terrible Dinner Guest (2016)
 Live in San Francisco (2019)

Other Appearances
 You Be My Heart (2013)

References

External links 
 Danielle's Website
 Danielle's Youtube channel

American women singer-songwriters
Living people
American ukulele players
1986 births
21st-century American singers
People from Grant, Nebraska
21st-century American women singers
Singer-songwriters from Colorado
Singer-songwriters from Nebraska